Ho Hau-cheung, SBS, BBS, MH (born 1952) was the Chairman of Sha Tin District Council between 2012 and 2019. He was the District Councillor for the Lower Shing Mun constituency, and stepped down at the 2019 District Council elections. He was equally convenor of the Civil Force, which formed an alliance with the New People's Party since 2014.He was awarded the Silver Bauhinia Star by the Hong Kong SAR Government in 2017.

References

1952 births
Living people
New People's Party (Hong Kong) politicians
Civil Force politicians
District councillors of Sha Tin District
Recipients of the Silver Bauhinia Star
Recipients of the Bronze Bauhinia Star